The Congoo gecko (Strophurus congoo) is a species of lizard in the family Diplodactylidae. The species is endemic to Australia.

Etymology
The specific name, congoo, is in honor of the Congoo family who have native title to the land on which the holotype was collected.

Geographic range
S. congoo is found in northern Queensland, Australia.

Habitat
The preferred habitat of S. congoo is forest.

References

Further reading
Vanderduys E (2016). "A new species of gecko (Squamata: Diplodactylidae: Strophurus) from northern Queensland, Australia". Zootaxa 4117 (3): 341–358. (Strophurus congoo, new species).

Strophurus
Reptiles described in 2016
Taxa named by Eric P. Vanderduys
Geckos of Australia
Reptiles of Queensland